Pierre-André Boutang (March 25, 1937, in Paris – August 20, 2008, in Porticcio, Corsica) was a French documentary filmmaker, producer and director. He was one of the leaders of the Franco-German channel Arte as well as of La Sept previously.

Biography
Son of Marie-Claire and maurrasianist and monarchist philosopher Pierre Boutang, and half-brother of Yann Moulier-Boutang, he was married to Martine Ferrand, editor at Éditions Grasset, with whom he had a daughter, Adrienne, teacher-researcher specializing in American cinema and half-sister of French radio journalist Émilie Aubry and novelist Gwenaëlle Aubry.

Formation
As a student at Sciences Po in 1958, he met Jean-Daniel Pollet and joined the ORTF as assistant director.

Career
He was close to French film producer Jean-Pierre Rassam.

Filmography

Documentary

Director
 1966 : Jean-Pierre Melville, François Truffaut, Collection Les écrans de la ville.
 1968 : Pierre Kast, Collection Les écrans de la ville.
 1970 : Jean-Pierre Melville à propos du « Cercle rouge », Collection Le journal du cinéma.
 1971 : Jean-Pierre Léaud à propos du film "Les Deux Anglaises et le continent", Collection Le journal du cinéma.
 1980 : Marco Ferreri, Meryl Streep, Collection Ciné regards
 1980 : Peter Sellers à propos de Jacques Tati, Collection Cine regard
 1980 : Isabelle Huppert à propos de "Loulou " et de Maurice Pialat, Collection Champ contrechamp
 1982 : Godard à Cannes
 1983 : Orson Welles
 1988 : La bibliothèque idéale : 2/2 "Ce vice impuni, la lecture…"
 1989 : Archives du XXe siècle : Emmanuel Berl (1892 - 1976) 1/2
 1989 : Archives du XXe siècle : Emmanuel Berl (1892 - 1976) 2/2
 1990 : Zulawski-Raimondi-Godounov
 1990 : Débat sur les destin des boucs émissaires entre René Girard, universitaire et Roberto Calasso, directeur des éditions Adelphi
 1990 : André Dhôtel
 1990 : Le Louvre. Du donjon à la pyramide
 1990 : Fidel Castro. Octobre 1990
 1991 : Merci la vie
 1991 : Archives du XXe siècle : Ungaretti 1/2
 1991 : Archives du XXe siècle : Ungaretti 2/2
 1991 : Archives du XXe siècle : Eugenio Montale
 1991 : Eugène Delacroix, l'ange ou le barbare
 1991 : Jean-Paul II
 1992 : Jean-Louis Étienne, le paysan des pôles
 1992 : Serge Daney : itinéraire d’un ciné-fils 1 – Le temps des Cahiers, Collection « Océaniques »
 1992 : Serge Daney : itinéraire d’un ciné-fils 2 – des « Cahiers » à « Libé », Collection « Océaniques »
 1992 : Serge Daney : itinéraire d’un ciné-fils 3 – Le regard du zappeur, Collection « Océaniques »
 1993 : Pierre Braunberger : producteur de films 1/3
 1993 : Pierre Braunberger : producteur de films 2/3
 1993 : Pierre Braunberger : producteur de films 3/3
 1995 : Kino Cinéma – Woody Allen, Collection « Metropolis »
 1996 : Antonioni toujours, Collection « Metropolis »
 1997 : Conversation avec Dario Fo
 1999 : 13 journées dans la vie de Pablo Picasso
 1999 : Otar Iosseliani, un Georgien à Paris, Collection « Thema »
 2000 : La Joconde sourit aux primitifs
 2000 : Depardieu le regard des autres, Collection « Thema »
 2002 : Tati à la plage, Collection « Metropolis »
 2003 : Raoul Girardet 
 2004 : Toni Negri, des années de plomb à l'empire
 2004 : Jean Rouch raconte à Pierre-André Boutang
 2005 : La Cinémathèque du 21e siècle, Collection « Metropolis »
 2005 : Alexandre Soljenitsyne, le combat d'un homme 
 2006 : Piccoli !, Collection « Metropolis »
 2006 : René Girard – la violence et le sacré
 2006 : Le musée du Quai Branly
 2007 : Jeanne M. Côté cour, côté cœur

Producer 
 1965 : Fritz Lang, Collection « Les écrans de la ville ».
 1965 : Truffaut, Wilder, Collection « Les écrans de la ville ».
 1965 : Jean Rouch, Collection « Les écrans de la ville ».
 1965 : La Règle du jeu, Collection « Les écrans de la ville ».
 1966 : Jean-Luc Godard, Collection « Les écrans de la ville ».
 1966 : François Truffaut à propos d’Alfred Hitchcock, Collection « Les écrans de la ville
 1971 : Les acteurs de « Trafic » parlent du film de Tati, Collection "le journal du cinéma"
 1971 : Jean-Pierre Léaud à propos du film « Les Deux Anglaises et le continent, Collection « Le journal du cinéma ».
 1976 : Sartes par lui-même
 1979 : « Tess » de Roman Polanski, Collection « Ciné regards ».
 1980 : Elia Kazan, Collection « Ciné regards ».
 1980 : Marco Ferreri, Meryl Streep, Collection « Ciné regards ».
 1980 : Maurice Pialat, Collection « Ciné regards ».
 1981 : King Vidor
 1981 : Gloria Swanson, Collection « Ciné regards ».
 1981 : Joseph Mankiewicz, Collection « Ciné regards ».
 1982 : Godard à Cannes
 1987 : De Bernanos à Pialat : Sous le soleil de Satan, Collection « Océaniques ».
 1987 : Duras-Godard, Collection « Océaniques »
 1988 : L’âge des Cinémathèques, Collection « Océaniques ».
 1991 : Krystof Kieslowski, Collection « Océaniques »
 1996 : L'Abécédaire de Gilles Deleuze
 2006 : Mao, une histoire chinoise

Fiction producer 
 1972 : Nous ne vieillirons pas ensemble, Maurice Pialat.
 1972 : Tout le monde il est beau, tout le monde il est gentil, Jean Yanne
 1973 : Moi y'en a vouloir des sous, Jean Yanne
 1973 : La Grande Bouffe, Marco Ferreri coproduit avec Jean-Pierre Rassam
 1974 : Lancelot du Lac, Robert Bresson.
 1975 : Numéro deux, Jean-Luc Godard.
 1978 : Comment ça va?, de Jean-Luc Godard.
 1974 : Les Chinois à Paris, de Jean Yanne.
 1984 : Favoris de la Lune, d'Otar Iosselliani

Actor
1972: Everybody he's handsome, everybody he's nice, by Jean Yanne
1972: We Will Not Grow Old Together, by Maurice Pialat
1973: La Grande bouffe, by Marco Ferreri
1973: Moi y'en a vouloir des sous, by Jean Yanne
1974: Touche pas à la femme blanche, by Marco Ferreri
1974: Lancelot du lac, by Robert Bresson
1974: Les Chinois à Paris, by Jean Yanne.
1985 : Cinématon #545, de Gérard Courant : lui-même.

Interviews 
 1978 : Marcello Mastroianni, Collection « L’homme en question ».
 1987 : Dom Juan, le mythe et la réalité » de Jean-Marie Carzou, Collection "Océaniques"
 1988 : La bibliothèque idéale : 1/2 Voyage aux bibliothèques., Collection "Océaniques"
 1989 : Satyajit Ray, Calcutta 89, Collection « Océaniques ».
 1999 : Leos Carax – Interview, Collection « Metropolis ».
 2006 : Polanski par Polanski Collection, « Thema ».

Achorman 
 1964 : Antonioni, Collection « Les écrans de la ville »
 1992 : Le FIPA à Cannes. de Guy Seligmann

References

1937 births
2008 deaths
French documentary filmmakers
French documentary film directors
French journalists